Chah Ab or Chahab may refer to:
 Chah Ab District (چاه اب - Chāh Āb), Afghanistan
 Chahab, Fars (چاه اب - Chāhāb), Iran
 Chahab, Kohgiluyeh and Boyer-Ahmad (چهاب - Chahāb), Iran
 Chah Ab, Razavi Khorasan (چاه اب - Chāh Āb), Iran